Omrop Fryslân is a broadcaster on the NPO which serves the Frisian community. Because West Frisian is an official language of the Kingdom of the Netherlands, the NPO is also responsible for broadcasts in the West Frisian language.

Omrop Fryslân is also the regional public broadcaster for the province Friesland, and they have their own radio station and TV channel broadcasting primarily for the province itself.

Radio 
In 1946, the RON (Radio Omroep Noord)—later RONO (Radio Omroep Noord en Oost)—started broadcasting for the north and east of the Netherlands. In 1978, RONO was split in Radio Noord, Radio Oost and Radio Fryslân. Since 1988, Omrop Fryslân is a broadcaster in its own right.

Omrop Fryslân can be received on analogue terrestrial radio on 92.2 MHz FM. It is also available on cable (both analogue and digital), Digitenne (DVB-T) and the internet.

Regional television 
Since 1994, Omrop Fryslân has had its own regional TV channel. The regional news bulletin called Fryslân Hjoed (meaning Friesland Today) is broadcast daily at 18.00, and repeated every hour, with the last rebroadcast the next morning at 8.00.

Omrop Fryslân TV can be received free-to-air on DVB-T (Digitenne). It is also available on cable (both analogue and digital), satellite and the internet.

National television 
Because West Frisian is an official language in the Netherlands, Omrop Fryslân also has airtime on national public television for 36 hours a year. Out of these 36 hours, 15 hours are assigned for school television in West Frisian. The rest of the airtime is mainly used for documentaries, which are broadcast on Saturday mornings and Sunday afternoons on NPO 2.

References

External links
Official website 

Mass media in Leeuwarden
West Frisian language
Netherlands Public Broadcasting
Radio stations established in 1946
Television channels and stations established in 1994
Television channels in the Netherlands
1946 establishments in the Netherlands